AshBritt Environmental, commonly referred to as AshBritt or AshBritt, Inc., is located in Deerfield Beach, Florida and is a company specializing in disaster relief operations.

Overview
AshBritt Environmental is a Florida-based, national rapid-response disaster recovery and special environmental services contractor.  AshBritt was founded in 1992 and has managed and executed around 100 disaster projects and close to 30 special environmental projects. AshBritt has been involved in the debris recovery efforts of 30 federally declared major disasters in eleven states, beginning with Hurricane Andrew.

Hurricane Katrina
Following Hurricane Katrina in August 2005, as the United States Army Corps of Engineers (USACE) Advanced Contracting Initiative (ACI) contractor for U.S. Region 3, AshBritt was the Initial Response contractor for both Louisiana and Mississippi.

Other Notable Responses
AshBritt also played a part in assisting with cleanup from Hurricane Sandy, working with at least 15 counties and 43 municipalities in New Jersey to clear around 3 million cubic yards of debris. 

In 2016, AshBritt worked across Florida, Georgia, and South Carolina.

AshBritt has also worked on stacking dilapidated and rusted shipping containers along the Arizona border in a controversial last ditch attempt by the outgoing Republican governor, Doug Ducey, to appear tough on immigration and fill intermittent gaps between fencing erected by former president Donald Trump.

References

External links
Ashbritt website

Engineering companies of the United States
Companies based in Broward County, Florida
Deerfield Beach, Florida
American companies established in 1992
1992 establishments in Florida